The 2017–18 Long Beach State 49ers men's basketball team represented California State University, Long Beach during the 2017–18 NCAA Division I men's basketball season. The 49ers were led by 11th-year head coach Dan Monson and played their home games at the Walter Pyramid as members of the Big West Conference. They finished the season 15–18, 9–7 in Big West play to finish in fifth place. They lost in the quarterfinals of the Big West tournament to Cal State Fullerton.

Previous season 
The 49ers finished the 2016–17 season 15–19, 9–7 in Big West play to finish in fourth place. They defeated Hawaii in the quarterfinals of the Big West tournament before losing to UC Irvine in the semifinals.

Offseason

Departures

Incoming transfers

2017 incoming recruits

2018 incoming recruits

Roster

Schedule and results

|-
!colspan=9 style=| Exhibition

|-
!colspan=9 style=| Non-conference regular season

|-
!colspan=9 style=| Big West regular season 

|-
!colspan=9 style=| Big West tournament

References

Long Beach State Beach men's basketball seasons
Long Beach State
Long Beach State 49ers men's basketball
Long Beach State 49ers men's basketball